Moon Garden is a 2022 American dark fantasy horror film written and directed by Ryan Stevens Harris, and starring Haven Lee Harris, Augie Duke, Brionne Davis, Maria Olsen, Timothy Lee DePriest, Philip E. Walker, and Morgana Ignis. The film follows a young girl named Emma (Haven Lee Harris) who slips into a coma and finds herself in a surreal, industrial dream world where she is haunted by a monster who feeds off her tears.

Moon Garden premiered at the 25th Dances With Films Festival on June 10, 2022. The film is slated for a theatrical release in the United States by Oscilloscope Laboratories in 2023.

Cast
 Haven Lee Harris as Emma
 Augie Duke
 Brionne Davis
 Maria Olsen
 Timothy Lee DePriest as Groom
 Philip E. Walker
 Morgana Ignis as Teeth

Release
Moon Garden had its world premiere at the 25th Dances With Films Festival in Los Angeles, California, on June 10, 2022. On October 8, 2022, the film screened at the Grimmfest Film Festival in the United Kingdom. On November 3, 2022, it screened at the 9th FilmQuest Film Festival in Provo, Utah.

Moon Garden is slated to be theatrically released in the United States by Oscilloscope Laboratories in 2023.

Reception
On the review aggregator website Rotten Tomatoes, the film has an approval rating of 100% based on eight reviews, with an average rating of 8/10.

Sharai Bohannon of Dread Central praised the film's setting and the Teeth character, and wrote, "Moon Gardens world, and the imagery it provides, are what will keep audiences talking. It's so absorbing that it makes it hard to dwell on things that aren't working in the film."

References

External links
 

2022 fantasy films
2022 horror films
American fantasy films
American dark fantasy films
American horror films